The Shakespeare Workout was an interdisciplinary literature, theatre history and acting class taught by Eloïse Watt, a Shakespearean actor, director and teacher, at the Michael Howard Studios in New York City from 1990 to 2004.

Alumni

 Marnie Andrews
 David Basson
 Felicia Bertsch
 Mary Birdsong
 David Blatt
 Greta Boeringer
 Munro M. Bonnell
 Damian Buzzerio
 Deborah Carlson
 Anna Cody
 Eric Joseph Cohen
 Thomas Cox
 Craig Doescher
 John Doman
 Sandra Drew
 Rachel Elson
 Danny Ettinger
 Ian Fleet
 John Gaines
 Rob Gaines
 Tina Gaud
 Martha Kayte Ginsberg
 Katherine Gooch-Breault
 Catherine Goodman
 Ian Gould
 Richard Grayson (Westerns actor)
 Virginia Hammer
 Suzanne Hayes
 David Hilder
 Jim Jack
 Joanne Joseph
 Peter H. Judd
 Suzanne Karseras
 Emily King
 Tom Paitson Kelly
 Kate Konigisor
 Michael Lewis
 Nicole Maggi
 Neil Martin
 Susan McCallum
 Patrick McCarthy
 Steven McElroy (theatre director)
 Mary Alice McGuire
 Lynn McNutt
 Natalie Miller
 Sami Plotkin
 Joshua Polenberg
 Julie Polk
 Edward Porter
 Gerit Quealy
 Bethany Reeves
 Kevin Reifel
 Cynthia Ricks
 Erika Rolfsrud
 Cheryl Royce
 Marie Sassi
 Rahadyan Sastrowardoyo
 Claire M. Schwartz
 David Douglas Smith
 Peggy Suzuki
 Tony Torn
 Adam Vignola
 John Walsh
 Jamie Ward
 Ruth Weber
 David Cole Wheeler
 Aya Yamakawa

References

External links
 The London Shakespeare Workout homepage

1990 establishments in New York City
Shakespearean scholarship
Drama schools in the United States
Performing arts education in New York City
History of theatre
2004 disestablishments in New York (state)